Jordi Calavera Espinach (born 2 August 1995) is a Spanish footballer who plays as a right back for CD Lugo.

Club career
Born in Cabra del Camp, Tarragona, Catalonia, Calavera finished his youth formation with Gimnàstic de Tarragona, and was called up to the first team by manager Santi Castillejo for the pre-season in 2013. He made his senior debut on 25 August of that year, starting in a 1–2 home defeat against Lleida Esportiu in the Segunda División B.

Two days later, Calavera renewed his link with Nàstic, signing until 2016, and was definitely promoted to the main squad, as a replacement to Sporting de Gijón B-bound Alberto Benito. However, he spent the whole campaign mainly as a backup to Juanjo, as his side missed out promotion in the play-offs.

On 19 January 2015, after being again second-choice (now to another new signing, Gerard Valentín), Calavera was loaned to UE Olot also in the third level, until June. On 9 September he made his professional debut, starting in a 2–2 home draw against Girona FC for the season's Copa del Rey (5–4 success on penalties).

On 27 September 2015 Calavera made his Segunda División debut, coming on as a half-time substitute for Xisco Campos in a 0–0 away draw against Real Valladolid. On 17 October he scored his first goal in the category, netting the first in a 2–1 home success over Bilbao Athletic.

On 23 January 2016, Calavera was excluded from the first team after rejecting to sign a contract renewal despite previously verbally agreeing to it. On 8 March he apologized with the fans, but announced a pre-contract with La Liga side SD Eibar, being officially announced at his new club on 1 July.

On 12 August 2016, Calavera was loaned to CD Lugo in the second tier, for one year. On 29 August of the following year, he extended his contract with the Armeros until 2021 and was immediately loaned to fellow second division club Sporting de Gijón.

Upon returning, Calavera was assigned to the main squad, and made his top tier debut on 5 May 2019 by playing the latter minutes of a 1–0 home defeat of Real Betis. On 20 August, he was loaned to Girona in division two, with a buyout clause.

On 30 August 2020, Calavera terminated his contract with the Armeros, and returned to Girona on a two-year deal five days later. On 31 January 2022, he returned to Sporting also in a temporary deal.

On 10 July 2022, Calavera returned to Lugo on a two-year contract.

Personal life
Calavera's younger brother Josep is also a footballer. A midfielder, he too was groomed at Nàstic before joining FC Barcelona.

References

External links

1995 births
Living people
People from Alt Camp
Sportspeople from the Province of Tarragona
Spanish footballers
Footballers from Catalonia
Association football defenders
La Liga players
Segunda División players
Segunda División B players
Tercera División players
CF Pobla de Mafumet footballers
Gimnàstic de Tarragona footballers
UE Olot players
SD Eibar footballers
CD Lugo players
Sporting de Gijón players
Girona FC players